Colony Township is an inactive township in Knox County, in the U.S. state of Missouri. Colony Township was established in 1872, taking its name from Colony, Missouri.

References

Townships in Missouri
Townships in Knox County, Missouri